Ram Siya Ke Luv Kush (Ram Siya's Luv Kush) is an Indian mythological drama television series, which aired on Colors TV from 5 August 2019 to 10 February 2020. The series focused on the story of Rama and Sita as well as their children Luv and Kush. It starred Shivya Pathania, Himanshu Soni, Krish Chauhan, and Harshit Kabra in lead roles.

Plot
Ram comes back to Ayodhya after the victory over Lanka and after 14 years of exile. On the day of announcement of Sita's pregnancy, a washerwoman comes and shows the signs of harassment by her husband. She describes her condition and, after coming back, her husband raised questions about her character. Ram ordered that she should be accepted back. Rumours started spreading in Ayodhya about Sita's chastity, that she had stayed in the house of another man for a year and they did not believe on fire test. Sita decided to stop harassment against women and by going on an exile. Then Sita left Ayodhya and swore not to meet Sri Rama before the completion of her objective. She gave birth to twins Luv and Kush at Valmiki's hermitage after proving her chastity under the pseudonym of vandevi. Fourteen years passed, the brothers start listening to the verses of Ramayan from Sita Valmiki and Shatrughna. During ashvmedha yajna they doubted Ram's love for Sita and stopped the ashva. Then the whole family battled and finally they get their answers. Sita breaks the truth after that they are children of Ayodhya king Rama and she is Sita not vandevi. Brothers leave for Ayodhya to recite Ramayana to change the mindset of their male-dominated society. They started from the case of Shurpanakha. Finally, they were able to change the men’s mindset and get the women their rights back. Luv and Kush unite Sita and Ram. Sita goes inside Mother Earth as all her life’s motives have been fulfilled. Luv and Kush get their rights. After some time, Ram does Jal Samadhi and leaves the earth for heaven where he meets Sita. The show concludes with Ram and Sita blessing everyone else.

Cast

Main
 Shivya Pathania as Sita/Vandevi : Avatar of Goddess Lakshmi ;Ram's Wife; Bhumi Devi's daughter ; Janak-Sunaina's Adoptive elder daughter; mother of Luv-Kush(2019–20)
 Himanshu Soni as Rama/ Lord Vishnu : 7th Avatar of Lord Vishnu; Dashrath's eldest son; Kaushalya's son; Sita's husband ; Luv and Kush's Father (2019–20)
 Krish Chauhan as Kush : Ram and Sita's elder Son , Luv's twin - brother (2019–20)
 Harshit Kabra as Luv : Ram and Sita's younger Son , Kush's twin - brother (2019–20)

Recurring
 Navi Bhangu as Lakshmana : Sheshnag's Avatar; Ram's half- Brother; Dashrath's third son; Sumitra's elder son; Shatrughna's twin brother; Urmila's husband (2019–20)
 Kanan Malhotra as  Bharata : Lord Vishnu's Shankha's Avatar; Ram's half brother; Dashrath's second son, Kaikeyi's son; Mandavi's Husband(2019–20)
 Akhil Kataria as Shatrughna : Lord Vishnu's Sudarshan Chakra's Avatar ; Ram's half brother; Lakshman's twin-brother; Dashrath's fourth and youngest son; Sumitra's younger son; Shrutakirti's husband(2019–20)
 Nisha Nagpal as Urmila : Sita's younger sister; Janak-Sunaina's younger daughter; Lakshman's wife (2019–20)
 Richa Dixit as  Mandavi : Sita's cousin; Shrutakirti's elder sister; Bharat's wife(2019–20)
 Nikita Tiwari as  Shrutakirti : Sita's cousin; Mandavi's younger sister;  Shatrughna's wife(2019–20) 
 Zuber Ali as Hanuman : Pawandev and Anjani's Son ; Rama's Spiritual and True Devotee(2019–20)
 Sanjiv Sharma as Valmiki : Luv and Kush's Teacher; author of Ramayana(2019–20)
 Brownie Parashar as Vashishtha : Raghukul Brothers' teacher(2019–20)
 Shaleen Bhanot as Ravana : King of Lanka(2019–20)
 Falaq Naaz as Mandodari : Ravana's Wife(2019–20)
 Priya Sindhu  as  Shurpanakha : Ravana's Younger Sister. Her nose was cut by Lakshman when she tried to attack Sita to marry Rama(2019–20)
 Ajay Mishra as Vibhishana : Ravana's younger brother who supported Ram(2019–20)
 Vinit Kakar as Meghanada : Mandodari and Ravana's Eldest Son (2019–20)
 Shahbaz Khan as Janak : Sita and Urmila's Father and King of Mithila(2019–20)
 Sampada Vaze as Sunaina : Sita and Urmila's Mother and Queen of Mithila (2019–20)
 Ankur Nayyar as Dasharath : King of Ayodhya ; Father of Rama; Bharat ; Lakshman and Shatrughna(2019–20)
 Jaswinder Gardener as Kaushalya : Dasharatha's First Wife; Rama's Mother(2019–20)
 Preeti Gandwani as Sumitra : Dasharatha's Second Wife; Lakshman's and Shatrughna's mother (2019–20)
 Piyali Munshi as Kaikeyi : Dasharatha's Third wife; Bharat's Mother (2019–20)
 Nitant Kaushik as Dheera(2019–20)
 Tarun Khanna as Parashuram(6th avatar of Lord Vishnu/ Shiva(2019–20)
 Nimai Bali as Vali / Sugriva(2019–20)
 Puneet Vashisht as Vishwamitra: Ram and Lakshman's mentor in Tadka, Subahu's slaying, Sita's swayamvar(2019–20)
 Vijay Badlani as Indra(2019–20)
 Patrali Chattopadhyay as Tataka(2019–20)
 Yogesh Mahajan as Gautama(2019–20)
 Vasundhara Kaul as Mrutali(2019–20)
 Ajay Jayram as Nagarseth(2019–20)
 Pooja Sharma as River Sarayu, the Narrator(2019–20)
 Rajshekhar Upadhya as Purohit(2019–20)
 Nitin Parashar as Angada : Tara and Vali's Son (2019–20)
 Kamal Bohra as Nagarseth Son(2019–20)

Production and release
Viacom18 partnered with UC Browser for promoting the series. The show was launched in Ayodhya in a grand manner.

The budget of the series is about ₹650 crore with the sets set at Umargam in Gujarat.

The shoot of the series ended on 7 February 2020.

Controversy 
Protests were started by the Valmiki Community of Punjab to ban the series for representing a disfigured fact on the Sage Valmiki. A bandh of markets was called on 9 September 2019 by them. Amidst this issue, a man was shot in Jalandhar, Punjab. After this, the series was banned in Punjab on the orders of the CM Amarinder Singh. This bandh also caused discrepancies in train and bus services in Ludhiana.

The ministry of information and broadcasting council sent a notice on 11 September 2019 to the channel giving 15 days time for responding stating, "The show is harming the image of Maharishi Valmiki and causing hurt to the religious sentiments of a community."

It further stated, "Lord Ram has been shown to have visited Maharishi Valmiki’s ashram and met Luv and Kush, which is not true. He met Luv and Kush at the time of the Ashwamedh Yagya, when they captured their horse and waged a war."On 9 September 2019, the Punjab and Haryana High Court refused to stay the ban on the telecast of the series imposed by the state of Punjab. During the hearing, the channel argued on the ban order stating that it was passed without adhering to the principles of natural justice, and without the ingredients of Section 19 of the Cable Operators Regulation Act. They also offered to delete the scenes causing the controversy which was considered by the court thereby adjourning the case for the next hearing on 12 September. This resulted an imposement of FIR against the channel, producers and the actors in Amritsar and Jalandhar. They got an interim stay on the proceedings against them until 28 January 2020."The show draws from various texts, books and scriptures based on Ramayan and it is never our intention to hurt sentiments of any particular group,"a Viacom18 spokesperson said in a statement issued on 14 September 2019. They further stated, "We are closely working with the group and taking their feedback on board. We stay committed to working together to make this a show that Indians across geographies and generations enjoy uninhibited,"On 17 October 2019, the court set the ban order aside when the producers agreed to take corrective action for it. The hearing stated, "What clearly emerges is that the state government having taken a conscious decision of setting up a committee to look into the entire issue and the committee, post deliberations having suggested certain corrective measures/steps, the same have not only been accepted by the petitioner party but have been implemented in so far as the previous episodes of the serial and now have furnished an undertaking to even adhere to such corrective measures/steps for future telecast as well,". Further, the representatives of the channel agreed to delete that scene in all the digital platforms and also to air a special episode on the greatness of Valmiki in accordance with the information provided by the community.

References

External links
 
 

2019 Indian television series debuts
Colors TV original programming
Hindi-language television shows
Television shows based on poems
Television series based on the Ramayana
2020 Indian television series endings
Swastik Productions television series